Vladimir Herța (May 14, 1868, Chișinău - August 3, 1924, Chișinău) was a Moldovan politician, mayor of Chișinău between 1918-1919. He has played an important role in the act of the  Union.

Biography 
Vladimir Herța was born on May 14, 1868, in Chișinău. He studied at the Gymnasium No.1, the most prestigious educational institution in Bessarabia which he graduated in 1866. According to some sources he graduated from a legal high school in Yaroslavl. After that, he married without being blessed by his father. Then, the young man moved to Italy and became a traveling singer. Next, he wasted all his parental wealth in Romania. In 1917 he became the vice-president of the National Moldavian Party and the Moldovan Cultural Society. He played a significant role in unification.

He was the head of Zemstvo of Orhei County, the first president of the Moldovan School Committee. In 1918-1919 he was the mayor of Chișinău. He was also a delegate to peace conferences, on Bessarabia issue.

References 
 Iurie Colesnic, Basarabia Necunoscută, Vol. II.

External links 
 Vladimir Hertza

1868 births
1924 deaths
People from Kishinyovsky Uyezd
National Moldavian Party politicians
Moldovan MPs 1917–1918
Mayors of Chișinău
Romanian people of Moldovan descent
Moldovan jurists